Esporte Clube Paraguaçuense, commonly known as Paraguaçuense, is a currently inactive Brazilian football club based in Paraguaçu Paulista, São Paulo. The club was formerly known as Esporte Clube Municipal.

History
The club was founded on November 28, 1965, as Esporte Clube Municipal. They won the Campeonato Paulista Série A2 in 1993.

Achievements

 Campeonato Paulista Série A2:
 Winners (1): 1993

Stadium
Esporte Clube Paraguaçuense play their home games at Estádio Carlos Affini. The stadium has a maximum capacity of 15,102 people.

References

Esporte Clube Paraguaçuense
Inactive football clubs in Brazil
Association football clubs established in 1965
Football clubs in São Paulo (state)
1965 establishments in Brazil